State Route 236 (SR 236) is a state highway in the U.S. state of California. It is an approximately 18-mile (29 km) "C" shaped loop route of State Route 9 in the Santa Cruz Mountains that serves Big Basin Redwoods State Park. SR 236 begins in the community of Boulder Creek and ends at Governor's Camp in Big Basin State Park near the Waterman Gap.

Several sections of the road are less than two lanes wide and large vehicles are discouraged from traveling this road. The reason for the narrow road is to not disturb the large redwood trees that the road passes by in the densely forested lowlands.

Route description
SR 236 begins with an at-grade intersection with SR 9 within the small town of Boulder Creek. The road then heads northwestward through an area of evergreen forest, exiting the town. After several switchbacks, the route heads westward into Big Basin Redwoods State Park, where its name is Big Basin Highway. Amidst the park, the road turns abruptly toward the north, where it continues winding through the forest. As it exits the park, the road abruptly turns eastward again, heading again toward SR 9, where it meets its northern terminus.

SR 236 is not part of the National Highway System, a network of highways that are considered essential to the country's economy, defense, and mobility by the Federal Highway Administration.

Major intersections

See also

References

External links

AARoads- State Route 236
Caltrans: Route 236 highway conditions
California Highways: SR 236

236
State Route 236